After Murder Park is the third album by British alternative rock band The Auteurs, released in March 1996. The album was recorded at Abbey Road Studios and produced by Steve Albini. In 2014, British independent record label 3 Loop Music re-released the album as a 2CD Expanded Edition which included b-sides, alternate versions, radio session tracks and live recordings.

Recording 
After Murder Park was recorded in less than two weeks at Abbey Road Studios, following a year during which front man Luke Haines had spent most of his time in a wheelchair after jumping off a wall.

Haines had wanted to hire Steve Albini as a producer to achieve a rawer, darker sound than the Auteurs' previous album Now I'm a Cowboy, and to his surprise, the record label agreed. Recording commenced at the end of March 1995, and after only two weeks, the album was recorded and mixed. However, Hut decided to hold back the release for almost a year.

Reception
The album received mostly decent reviews, entered the British charts at number 33 and sold around 58,000 copies worldwide. During the heyday of Britpop, this was nonetheless seen as a commercial failure.

Trouser Press has called the album a "misanthropic mini-masterpiece."

Track listing
All songs written by Luke Haines.

Original CD/LP (CDHUT33/HUTLP33)
 "Light Aircraft on Fire" – 2:17
 "Child Brides" – 4:26
 "Land Lovers" – 2:31
 "New Brat in Town" – 3:55
 "Everything You Say Will Destroy You" – 2:42
 "Unsolved Child Murder" – 2:08
 "Married to a Lazy Lover" – 3:55
 "Buddha" – 2:52
 "Tombstone" – 3:59
 "Fear of Flying" – 4:41
 "Dead Sea Navigators" – 3:47
 "After Murder Park" – 2:00

Personnel
Personnel per booklet.

The Auteurs
 Luke Haines – guitar, Harmonium, vocals
 James Banbury – cello, Hammond, korg
 Alice Readman – bass guitar 
 Barny C. Rockford – drums

Additional musicians
 Andy Bush – French horn
 Marcus Broome – violin
 Eleanor Gilchrist – violin
 Theresa Whipple – viola
 Abigail Trundle – cello
 Bern Davis – cello

Production
 Steve Albini – recording
 Paul Hicks – assistant engineer
 Stefan De Batselier – inner photo
 Chris Cunningham – treated

References

External links

After Murder Park at YouTube (streamed copy where licensed)

1996 albums
The Auteurs albums
Hut Records albums
Albums produced by Steve Albini